Nyhetsmorgon is a Swedish  morning news and talk show that is broadcast every morning on TV4. Nyhetsmorgon started airing on 14 September 1992.

References

External links 
 
 

TV4 (Sweden) original programming
1992 Swedish television series debuts
Swedish television talk shows
Swedish television news shows